The Dramatic Imagination is a book written in 1941 by American scenic designer Robert Edmond Jones.

It is considered the basic blueprint from which all innovations of modern stage design have been crafted.

References

Non-fiction books about theatre
1941 non-fiction books